John Jesse may refer to:
 John John Jesse, American painter
 John Heneage Jesse, English historian